Lipopteninae is a subfamily of the fly family Hippoboscidae. All are parasitic.

Systematics
Genus Lipoptena Nitzsch, 1818
L. arianae Maa, 1969
L. axis Maa, 1969
L. binoculus (Speiser, 1908)
L. capreoli Rondani, 1878
L. cervi (Linnaeus, 1758)
L. chalcomleaena Speiser, 1904
L. couturieri Séguy, 1935
L. depressa
L. depressa depressa (Say, 1823)
L. depressa pacifica Maa, 1969
L. doszhanovi Grunin, 1974
L. efovea Speiser, 1905
L. fortisetosa Maa, 1965
L. grahami Bequaert, 1942
L. guimaraesi Bequaert, 1957
L. hopkinsi Bequaert, 1942
L. iniqua Maa, 1969
L. japonica Bequaert, 1942
L. mazamae Rondani, 1878
L. nirvana Maa, 1969
L. paradoxa Newstead, 1907
L. pauciseta Edwards, 1919
L. pteropi Denny, 1843
L. pudui Peterson & Maa, 1970
L. rusaecola Bequaert, 1942
L. saepes Maa, 1969
L. saltatrix Maa, 1969
L. sepiacea Speiser, 1905
L. sigma Maa, 1965
L. sikae Mogi, 1975
L. timida Maa, 1969
L. weidneri Maa, 1969
Genus Melophagus Latreille, 1802
M. antilopes (Pallas, 1777)
M. ovinus
M. ovinus ovinus (Linnaeus, 1758)
M. ovinus himalayae Maa, 1969
M. rupicaprinus Rondani, 1879
Genus Neolipoptena Bequaert, 1942
N. ferrisi Bequaert, 1935

References 

Parasitic flies
Hippoboscidae
Brachycera subfamilies